Hemsedalsfjella  (English: The Hemsedal mountains) are the mountains that surrounds Hemsedal Valley in Buskerud, Norway.  Most of the Hemsedal mountains is in Hemsedal municipality.

References 

Mountains of Viken